Osdorf is a municipality in the district of Rendsburg-Eckernförde, in Schleswig-Holstein, Germany.

The location of Osdorf is south of the municipality of Noer, but north of Gettorf and Felm, and west of Schwedeneck.

References

Municipalities in Schleswig-Holstein
Rendsburg-Eckernförde